Haruna Aziz Dari (born 23 May 2001) is a Ghanaian professional footballer who plays as goalkeeper for Ghanaian Premier League side Bechem United F.C.

Career 
Dari started his career with Kharis Sports Academy. In March 2021, he joined the senior side of Ghana Premier League side Bechem United F.C. during the second transfer period of the 2020–21 Ghana Premier League season. He made his debut after playing the full 90 minutes in a 2–1 victory over International Allies.

References

External links 

 

Living people
2001 births
Association football goalkeepers
Ghanaian footballers
Bechem United F.C. players
Ghana Premier League players
21st-century Ghanaian people